Matthew Quinn may refer to:

 Matthew Quinn (bishop) (1821–1885), Australian suffragan bishop
 Matthew Quinn (sprinter) (born 1976), South African sprinter

See also
 Matt Quinn (born 1993), New Zealand cricketer